Estella Campavias (1918–1990) was a British sculptor and ceramicist. She is known for glazed stoneware, as on display in the Victoria and Albert Museum.

Early life
Born in Istanbul, Campavias was of Scottish and Spanish extraction. She was brought up in Turkey  and travelled as the daughter of a diplomat. Self-taught, Campavias first found fame as a ceramicist, beginning her career in 1955, before developing as a sculptor in the 1970s.

Works
Her abstract sculptures take the form of smooth flowing figures, seemingly in movement. Her sculptures were exhibited in Italy, France and the United Kingdom. Some of her pieces: Head (c.1980), Reclining Figure (c.1980) and La Joie de Vivre (1988) were featured, for sale, in the Wolseley Fine Arts Catalogue of Modern and Contemporary Sculpture. In 2013, some of her previously unseen works were exhibited at the Glyndebourne Festival alongside the work of Sean Henry and Michael Craig-Martin. She was described by Roy Oppenheim as "one of the most exciting sculptors of our time". An image of Campavias, taken by Ida Kar is held in the collection of the National Portrait Gallery.

Further reading

References 

1918 births
1990 deaths
20th-century British artists
20th-century British women artists
English ceramicists
English people of Spanish descent
English people of Scottish descent
English women sculptors
British women ceramicists
20th-century ceramists
20th-century English women
20th-century English people
British expatriates in Turkey